Peter and the Piskies: Cornish Folk and Fairy Tales is a 1958 anthology of 34 fairy tales from Cornwall that have been collected and retold by Ruth Manning-Sanders and illustrated by Raymond Briggs. It was the first in a long series of such anthologies by Manning-Sanders.

In an author's note, Manning-Sanders says of the passing down of the tales: "A widow woman lived in a cottage by the sea. ... It was the piskies who told the old widow woman the stories in this book, and she told them to me, and now I am telling them to you."

Of the tales themselves, the book's dust jacket says: "The folk-tales of Cornwall are peopled with giants and saints and wicked demons; with the thieving, spiteful spriggans, the mischievous piskies who are always laughing, and the little bearded knockers who work industriously in the mines, and who, they say, are growing smaller with every year they live so that there will come a day when they are no size at all."

This book was first published in the United Kingdom in 1958, by Oxford University Press. It was not published in the United States until eight years later, by Roy Publishers. The information for this entry is taken from the U.S. version.

Table of contents
 1. Peter and the Piskies
 2. Skillywidden
 3. Lutey and the Mermaid
 4. Betty Stogs' Baby
 5. The Cock-Crow Stone
 6. Lyonesse
 7. The Boy and the Bull
 8. Saint Margery Daw
 9. From the Head Downward
 10. Tregeagle
 11. The Piskie Thresher
 12. Saint Neot
 13. The Knockers of Ballowal
 14. The Witch of Fraddam
 15. The Giant of the Mount
 16. The Spriggans' Treasure
 17. Cherry
 18. Bucca Dhu and Bucca Gwidden
 19. Fairies on the Gump
 20. Tom and Giant Blunderbus
 21. The Crowza Stones
 22. The Giant Holiburn
 23. Parson Wood and the Devil (1. The Demon Wrestler, 2. The Feathered Fiend)
 24. Madgy Figgey and the Sow
 25. The Tinner, the Dog, the Jew, and the Cake
 26. The Small People's Cow
 27. The Wish-hound
 28. The Demon Mason
 29. The Mermaid in Church
 30. Mr Noy
 31. Barker's Knee
 32. Peepan Pee
 33. Duffy and the Devil
 34. The Two Sillies

See also

Pixie (folklore)
Knocker (folklore)

Collections of fairy tales
Children's short story collections
Cornish culture
Cornwall in fiction
Cornish folklore
Picture books by Raymond Briggs
1958 short story collections
1958 children's books
British children's books
1958 anthologies